The American Independent Network was one of the first major attempts at building a commercial television network consisting of low-powered television stations. Started by Don Shelton, Randy Moseley, and Lyn Snyder, it was similar to the older Channel America (and its successor, America One (A1)), and was the foundation for Urban America TV (UATV).  In 2000, several stations sold by USA Networks to Univision carried AIN for about a year while Univision got their second network, TeleFutura, ready to launch on the stations.  AIN merged with Hispano Television Ventures in early 2000, forming Hispanic Television Network (HTVN). The new company operated both HTVN and AIN, but the majority of the company's attention was focused on HTVN. HTVN went off the air in 2003, while AIN went off the air two years earlier in 2001, and turned into Urban America Television, with most AIN affiliates either going independent or switching to other networks, like A1 or UATV.

See also
 AMGTV
 America One
 Channel America
 Hispanic Television Network
 Independent station
 Ion Television
 Network One
 Urban America Television

Defunct television networks in the United States
Television channels and stations disestablished in 2003
Television channels and stations established in 2000